Mount Sanford is a mountain in northwestern British Columbia, Canada, located  east of Atlin.

Mount Sanford is a volcanic feature of the Northern Cordilleran Volcanic Province that formed in the past 66.4 million years of the Cenozoic epoch.

See also
 List of volcanoes in Canada
 List of Northern Cordilleran volcanoes
 Volcanology of Canada
 Volcanology of Western Canada

References

One-thousanders of British Columbia
Volcanoes of British Columbia
Northern Cordilleran Volcanic Province
Cenozoic volcanoes
Cenozoic geology of North America
Cenozoic British Columbia
Cassiar Land District